The Foundation for International Cooperation in Higher Education of Taiwan (FICHET; Chinese: 高等教育國際合作基金會; pinyin: Gāoděng Jiāoyù Guójì Hézuò Jījīnhuì) was established in November 2005 by the Ministry of Education (Taiwan) and over 100 universities in Taiwan, and inaugurated formally in January 2006. Currently, the Foundation has a total of 119 member universities and colleges that are also its permanent member universities.

Mission 
FICHET coordinates domestic education systems, including the Association of National Universities of Taiwan, the Association of National Universities of Science and Technology of Taiwan, the Association of Private Universities and Colleges of Taiwan, and the Association of Private Universities and Colleges of Technology in Taiwan to promote international cooperation in higher education of Taiwan. 

By organizing international seminars of higher education, holding university fairs abroad, promoting domestic higher education and recruiting international students, FICHET encourages studying abroad in Taiwan and assists in international academic cooperation in higher education, etc.

Educator Conference 
FICHET coordinates and leads Taiwan’s higher education institutions to participate in international educators’ conferences such as APAIE, NAFSA and EAIE annually to increase the international visibility of Taiwan’s higher education, establish new cooperative programs, and attract more international students to study in Taiwan.

Bilateral Exchange 
In response to the impact of internationalization and globalization, FICHET has expanded Taiwan’s higher education exchange and collaboration programs by strengthening bilateral ties with specific countries or regions, including establishing and deepening the exchange programs, dual-degree programs, academic cooperation, and exchange opportunities between Taiwanese universities and overseas, seeks to promote the internationalization of Taiwanese universities and colleges and to act as a bridge/platform for international cooperation.
 Asia
 China: The Executive Conference on International and Cross-strait Affairs
 Japan: Taiwan-Japan University Presidents' Forum, Taipei-Osaka Higher Education Conference
 India: Taiwan-India University Presidents' Forum
 Europe
 EU Region: Taiwan-Europe Higher Education Conference, Taiwan-Europe Higher Education Partnership Networking
 Austria: Taiwan-Austria Higher Education Forum
 Belgium: Taiwan-Belgium Higher Education Roundtable
 Czech: Taiwan-Czech Higher Education Days
 France: Taiwan-France Higher Education Forum
 Germany: Taiwanese-German Higher Education Policy Forum
 Hungary: Taiwan-Hungary Roundtable
 Lithuania: Taiwan-Lithuania Higher Education Forum
 Poland: Taiwan-Poland Higher Education Forum
 Russia: Taiwan-Russia Higher Education Roundtable
 United Kingdom: Taiwan-UK Higher Education Forum
 America
 Canada: Taiwan-Canada Higher Education Forum
 United States: Taiwan-Florida Higher Education Conference, Taiwan-Maryland Higher Education Conference, Taiwan-US International Education Administrators/Senior Staff Networking Event
 Oceania
 New Zealand: Taiwan-New Zealand Higher Education Forum

Taiwan Education Center 
The Ministry of Education of Taiwan laid down the “Guidelines on Subsidizing the Establishment of the Taiwan Education Center Overseas”  issued on 8 February 2007, to implement the Executive Yuan’s enhancement program on international student enrollment and the governmental policy of promoting teaching Chinese as a second foreign language, and set up branch offices of Taiwan Education Center (TEC) to publicize Higher Education in Taiwan, guide international students applying to study in Taiwan, participate in overseas education exhibitions, offer Mandarin Chinese courses, and pursue opportunities for bilateral academic cooperation. Commissioned by the Ministry to promote the TECs, FICHET assists in the TECs’ development and informs Taiwan’s higher education institutions joining the TECs’ functions and services, thereby encouraging institutions to utilize the TECs in forging their global partnerships and increasing worldwide visibility.

Taiwan Experience Education Program (TEEP) 
Since 2015, the Ministry of Education of Taiwan has launched the Taiwan Experience Education Program (TEEP) to encourage international students to participate in short-term internship programs organized by Taiwan's universities and colleges.TEEP participants will be arranged in a lab, research unit, enterprise, or elementary/secondary school, and provided with opportunities to attend academic seminars, Mandarin learning courses, and cultural activities to enhance professional capabilities and connect with the academic or business market.

Executive Conference on International Affairs 
Since 2007, the Foundation for International Cooperation in Higher Education has regularly held exchange meetings for international affairs managers of higher education institutions, established a platform for sharing international affairs experience, expanded the network of internationalized higher education communities, and strengthened the practical experience of universities through various main topics. It has also served as a reference for the government to promote the internationalization of higher education. Over the years, topics discussed have included higher education international competitiveness and innovative research and development, Mandarin Chinese learning and overseas enrollment, international cooperation in higher education, current situation and international trends in vocational education, higher education international legal systems and environments, overseas students graduating and staying in Taiwan, global internships, and other topics, attracting over 100 international affairs managers or senior administrators from home and abroad to participate in the meetings.

International Administrator Training Project 
To assist higher education institutions in Taiwan in cultivating the professional competence of international affairs staff, and to continue the legacy and exchange of experience in business operations to benefit the development of the internationalization of higher education in universities and colleges of Taiwan, the Foundation holds relevant activities regularly each year to strengthen the professional competence of international affairs administrators. These include workshops, seminars and conferences, training courses, etc., to establish an international exchange platform for Taiwan's higher education institutions, and to collaborate with relevant academic institutions and professionals abroad to share the experiences, knowledge, or professional training.

Taiwan Mandarin Educational Resources Center 
The Ministry of Education in Taiwan established the "Office of Global Mandarin Education" in 2016 to integrate relevant educational resources, expand the attraction of overseas students to Taiwan to learn Mandarin, and build an international education brand in order to promote Mandarin language policy. The office was renamed as the "Taiwan Mandarin Educational Resources Center" in 2021, which promotes teacher training, teaching system implementation, digital research and development, international marketing, and industry-university cooperation. Starting from August 2022, these tasks are executed by the FICHET.

List of Chairpersons

References

External links 
 Foundation for International Cooperation in Higher Education of Taiwan
 Study in Taiwan
 Taiwan Experience Education Program (TEEP)
 The New Southbound Talent Development Program

Non-profit organizations based in Taiwan
2005 establishments in Taiwan